Xuzhou is a town under the administration of Zitong County, Sichuan, China. , it administers the following two residential neighborhoods and 19 villages:
Hongjunqiao Community
Xianfeng Community
Baiqing Village
Liaoyuan Village
Pingyuan Village
Lianmeng Village
Zhongba Village
Niutishan Village
Tianbao Village
Huanlong Village
Tongling Village
Zaoya Village
Yonggui Village
Ganzi Village
Yumen Village
Shuanglong Village
Baiya Village
Xiaoya Village
Shanquan Village
Jintian Village
Junmin Village

References 

Township-level divisions of Sichuan
Zitong County